Morteza Mirza Afshar was an Afsharid prince and the son of Nader Shah of Persia, who was renamed Nassrollah Mirza in honour of his role in the victory at Karnal. He proved to be a talented military leader and demonstrated his worth during the battle of Karnal by commanding the centre of the Persian army which defeated Sa'adat Khan's forces and captured his person.

He also held independent command during the Perso-Ottoman war of 1743-46 where he was tasked by Nader Shah of penetrating into Ottoman held Mosul province and engaging one of the two Ottoman armies whilst his father, Nader, marched against the other army at Kars in the north. He dealt a decisive blow to the Turkish and Kurdish forces around Mosul in the Battle of Mosul (1745).

See also
Joseph von Semlin

References

Afsharid dynasty
18th-century Iranian military personnel
Afsharid generals